Ström is a premium vodka, distilled by Shaman Spirits in Finland. The raw ingredients used are "spring-quality" water, grain and surplus potatoes harvested from the fields of Tyrnävä (near Oulu), an EU-graded high grade potato production area.

Besides Finland, Ström is available in the Baltic states, Poland, Italy, Spain and North America. It is marketed internationally by Atlantico Beverages Ltd Oy

Awards 
Ström Vodka won the Gold Award in the Super-Premium potato vodka category at the 7th International Wines & Spirits Contest held in Moscow in 2005.

Ström Vodka was also awarded the shared title of Best Beverage of Finland in a 2005 annual contest. Its smoothness was lauded by the panel.

References

External links
 Shaman Spirits web site
Atlantico Beverages product page http://www.atlantico-beverages.com/strom.php

Finnish brands
Finnish vodkas